Antonio Carlos da Silva Neto (born October 29, 1985), known as Neto Potiguar, is a Brazilian football player who currently plays for Club Celaya.

Club statistics

References

External links

J. League

1985 births
Living people
Brazilian footballers
Brazilian expatriate footballers
J1 League players
Albirex Niigata players
Esporte Clube Bahia players
Atlético Clube Goianiense players
ABC Futebol Clube players
Paysandu Sport Club players
Vila Nova Futebol Clube players
Marília Atlético Clube players
Itumbiara Esporte Clube players
Sociedade Esportiva do Gama players
Sociedade Esportiva e Recreativa Caxias do Sul players
Lobos BUAP footballers
Expatriate footballers in Japan
Expatriate footballers in Mexico
Association football forwards
People from Natal, Rio Grande do Norte
Sportspeople from Rio Grande do Norte